Perrierodendron rodoense is a tree in the family Sarcolaenaceae. It is endemic to Madagascar. The specific epithet  is for the Irodo River (or Rodo), where the species was studied.

Description
Its chartaceous to subcoriaceous leaves are obovate in shape. The inflorescences bear a single flower with five sepals and five whitish petals. The fruits are unknown.

Distribution and habitat
Perrierodendron rodoense is known only from a single location in the Irodo basin in the northern region of Diana. Its habitat is dry forests from sea level to  altitude.

References

Sarcolaenaceae
Endemic flora of Madagascar
Trees of Madagascar
Plants described in 2000
Flora of the Madagascar dry deciduous forests